Seppo Antero Eskelinen (born 4 July 1960, in Kontiolahti) is a Finnish politician currently serving in the Parliament of Finland for the Social Democratic Party of Finland at the Savonia-Karelia constituency.

References

1960 births
Living people
People from Kontiolahti
Social Democratic Party of Finland politicians
Members of the Parliament of Finland (2019–23)